Myristica ampliata is a species of plant in the family Myristicaceae. It is endemic to Queensland, Australia.

References

Magnoliids of Australia
ampliata
Vulnerable flora of Australia
Flora of Queensland
Vulnerable biota of Queensland
Taxonomy articles created by Polbot